Keith Robinson may refer to:

Keith Robinson (actor) (born 1976), American actor and R&B singer
Keith Robinson (rugby union) (born 1976), former New Zealand rugby union footballer
Keith Robinson (environmentalist) (born c. 1941), owner of Niihau
Keith Robinson (comedian) (born 1963), American stand-up comedian
Keith Robinson (Australian footballer) (1930–2002), Australian rules footballer
Keith Robinson (cricketer) (born 1933), English cricketer